The Battle of Ruspina was fought on 4 January 46 BC in the Roman province of Africa, between the Republican forces of the Optimates and forces loyal to Julius Caesar. The Republican army was commanded by Titus Labienus, Caesar's former lieutenant during the Gallic Wars who had defected to the Republican side at the beginning of the civil war.

Prelude
Julius Caesar arrived at Lilybaeum in Sicily on 17 December 47 BC and built up an invasion force there to crush the Optimates in Africa. Caesar failed to gather enough transport shipping to carry his army of six legions in a single fleet and a large quantity of transport animals, food, and fodder were left behind in Sicily. Caesar hoped the supply situation would improve in Africa. He set sail on 25 December, but his poor planning based on limited information about a good landing site and strong winds scattered his convoy.

Caesar landed near Hadrumentum on 28 December with only 3,000 legionaries and 150 cavalry. He fell down on the beach but dispelled his officers' superstitions by grabbing some pebbles and proclaiming "I have hold of you, Africa!". Having failed to concentrate his force, Caesar lacked the strength to besiege or compel the surrender of Hadrumentum and set up camp near Ruspina. On 1 January 46 BC, he captured the town of Leptis where he was reinforced 
by some of his scattered troops (elements of fifth and the tenth legions). The next day several more reinforcements arrived at Ruspina. He left six cohorts to garrison Leptis and marched back to Ruspina. On 4 January Caesar went off on a foraging mission, initially with 9000 legionaries in thirty understrength cohorts. Three miles out, the enemy was spotted and Caesar sent for his 400 cavalry and 150 archers as well. Caesar then personally led a reconnaissance.

Battle
Titus Labienus commanded the Optimate force and had his 8,000 Numidian cavalry and 1,600 Gallic and Germanic cavalry deploy in unusually close and dense formations for cavalry. The deployment accomplished its goal of misleading Caesar, who believed them to be close-order infantry. Caesar therefore deployed his army in a single extended line to prevent envelopment, with his small force of 150 archers up front and the 400 cavalry on the wings. In a surprising move, Labienus then extended his cavalry on both flanks to envelop Caesar, bringing up his Numidian light infantry in the center. The Numidian light infantry and cavalry began to wear the Caesarian legionaries down with javelins and arrows. This proved very effective, as the legionaries could not retaliate. The Numidians would simply withdraw to a safe distance and continue launching projectiles. The Numidian cavalry routed Caesar's cavalry and succeeded in surrounding his legions, who redeployed into a circle to face attacks from all sides. The Numidian light infantry bombarded the legionaries with missiles. Caesar's legionaries threw their pila at the enemy in return, but were ineffective. The nervous Roman soldiers bunched up together, making themselves easier targets for the Numidian missiles.

Titus Labienus rode up to the front rank of Caesar's troops, coming very near in order to taunt the enemy troops. A veteran of the Tenth Legion approached Labienus, who recognized him. The veteran threw his pilum at Labienus's horse, killing it. "That'll teach you Labienus, that a soldier of the Tenth is attacking you", the veteran growled, shaming Labienus in front of his own men. Some men however began to panic. An aquilifer attempted to flee but Caesar grabbed the man, spun him around and shouted "the enemy are over there!"

Caesar gave the order to make the battle line as long as possible and every second cohort to turn around, so the standards would be facing the Numidian cavalry in the Romans' rear and the other cohorts the Numidian light infantry to the front. The legionaries charged and threw their pila, scattering the Optimates infantry and cavalry. They pursued their enemy for a short distance, and began to march back to camp. However Marcus Petreius and Gnaeus Calpurnius Piso appeared with 1,600 Numidian cavalry and a large number of light infantry who harassed Caesar's legionaries as they retreated. Caesar redeployed his army for combat and launched a counterattack that drove the Optimates forces back over high ground. Petreius was wounded at this point. Completely exhausted, both armies withdrew back to their camps.

Aftermath
Caesar had been defeated, having failed in his mission of gathering supplies. However, his army remained intact; Caesar fortified his camp at Ruspina and equipped sailors as light infantry to serve on land. The army's craftsmen manufactured slingshots and javelins and Caesar sent messages to bring up as much grain and other supplies as possible.

Metellus Scipio joined forces with Labienus and Petreius and they set up camp three miles from Caesar's.

Citations

Bibliography

External links
Caesar Beats the Odds: The Battle of Ruspina

Ruspina
46 BC
Africa (Roman province)
Ruspina
1st century BC
Military history of Tunisia
40s BC